(also written 2005 TN74) is a trans-Neptunian object (TNO) in a 3:5 resonance with Neptune. It was discovered by Scott S. Sheppard and Chadwick A. Trujillo in 2005.

It was initially suspected of being a Neptune trojan since the first observations gave it a semi-major axis of 30 AU and an orbital eccentricity of 0.16, but further observations showed it to have a semi-major axis of 42.7 AU, a perihelion of 32.1 AU, and an aphelion of 53.4 AU.

With an absolute magnitude of 7.2, it has an expected diameter in the range of 85 to 240 km.

It has been observed 19 times over four oppositions.

References

External links 
 

613100
613100
613100
20051008